The 2014 Central Oklahoma Bronchos football team represented the University of Central Oklahoma during the 2014 NCAA Division II football season, and completed the 109th season of Broncho football. The Bronchos played their six home games at Wantland Stadium in Edmond, Oklahoma, which has been Central Oklahoma's home stadium since 1965. The 2014 team came off a 2-8 record for the second season in a row. The 2014 team was headed by third year head coach Nick Bobeck. 2014 was the Bronchos 3rd as a member of the Mid-America Intercollegiate Athletics Association (MIAA). The team finished the regular season with an 8-3 record and made the program's first appearance in the Mineral Water Bowl.

Preseason outlook
The conference rankings were released on August 5. In a repeat of last year's preseason rankings Central Oklahoma was ranked 10th in the Coaches Poll and 11th in the Media Poll.

Media
Every Central Oklahoma game was broadcast on KNAH 99.7 F.M. for the second consecutive season.

As part of the MIAA network slate of games, the Missouri Southern State and Nebraska–Kearney games aired locally on a tape delayed basis on the Sunday night following the games. The MIAA reserved the last week of the TV schedule to be a flex game with significant importance to conference. The Bronchos game against Pittsburg State was added to the TV schedule.

Schedule

Coaching staff

Roster

Rankings

Game summaries

Fort Hays State

Statistics

Team

Scores by quarter

References

Central Oklahoma
Central Oklahoma Bronchos football seasons
Central Oklahoma Bronchos football